Miguel Simões Jacobetty Rosa (1901–1970) was a Portuguese architect. One of his greatest works was the designing of the Estádio Nacional (National Stadium), located near Lisbon.

1901 births
1970 deaths
20th-century Portuguese architects

Portuguese people of Italian descent